The Eroticist is a 1972 Italian commedia sexy all'italiana film directed (and co-written) by Lucio Fulci. It had censorship problems and was banned shortly after its release. Later it was released in a heavily cut version and prohibited for persons under 18 years.

Plot

Sen. Gianni Puppis arrives at Rome's airport to greet the female president of the Republic of Urania. Puppis, a contender for the next Italian Chief (President) of State, is captured on film furtively groping her bottom as she greets the Italian press. No one notices the incident, and the victim is unsure who was responsible due to the crowd gathered around her. The TV film editor studies the film with a colleague and remarks, "but he's queer!" Still photos of the incident fall into the hands of a highly unorthodox priest called Father Lucian, an old college friend of Puppis. He arranges a meeting with the bemused politician in a confessional booth and then demands blackmail money for the pictures. Puppis is furious but mystified, for he cannot remember anything about the incident. He leaves the confessional booth refusing to pay. That night, Puppis has a strange dream in which a naked young woman beckons him, superimposed over the circular plaza of St. Peter's Basilica and the Vatican.

Puppis calls the unscrupulous Father Lucian and offers him the money. In return, Lucian offers to arrange a consultation with a German psychiatrist. During the session, Puppis describes his recent affliction: his dreams and waking thoughts are becoming obsessed with behinds, primarily female ones, despite his open preference for fey young men like his personal chauffeur Carmelino. Asses fill his thoughts and even precipitate black-outs, during which he commits terrible acts of bottom-pinching. "We've got to lick this thing," says Father Lucian. Puppis leaves, vowing to maintain his self-control. But later that day, his hands wander while standing behind a young lady in an elevator at the Senate offices.

The next day, Puppis announces that he is going on a "spiritual retreat" until the results of the elections are announced. Father Lucian drives the frantic Puppis into the countryside, stopping at a filling station to get gas. Puppis experiences a veritable barrage of ladies' bottoms at the filling station forecourt. Before Father Lucian can stop him, Puppis has lurched over to one tartan-frocked figure bent over to examine the a car's engine, only to find himself face to face with a furious kilt-wearing Scotsman. Later that day, Lucian and Puppis finally arrive at a cloister run by his friend Father Schirer, a priest and psychiatrist. However, Puppis is blind drunk after consuming several bottles of liquor he bought at the rest stop. Father Schirer welcomes the esteemed patient and informs the barely conscious man that his many skilled nurses will help him. The clinic is staffed by nuns, all of them young and beautiful. That night, Father Schirer is woken up when one of the nurses assigned to watch over Puppis is grabbed on her bottom by the sleeping man. Father Schirer tells the nun that she must remain still until morning, as waking the patent would be too traumatic, under the circumstances.

Back in Rome, Senator Puppis' absence is the subject of heated discussions. His political opponents to the more conservative Sen. Torsello have been bugging his telephone and are puzzled over coded conversations between Puppis and Father Lucian. But the Italian Army has been bugging the senate phones in the hope of learning something that will ensure the planned military coup stays on course. The Vatican secret police, led by the persistent Mafioso Don Gesualdo, have been bugging the Army's phones and learning about Puppi's mysterious exit. Cardinal Maravigili, an influential member of the clergy, which has the real power in Italy, is sitting in his office watching the film footage of Puppis at the airport. Cardinal Maravigili is enraged, for apparently, Puppis owes his political success to shady deals with the Vatican and military hierarchy. Maravigili, a manipulative sociopath willing to murder to facilitate divine will, has groomed Puppis for the position of president. Even Puppis' preference for men is tolerated because the Cardinal confides in Don Gesualdo that he prefers that Puppis should be homosexual, expecting minor scandal from this man than the customary womanizing of Italian politicians.

At the spiritual retreat, Puppis describes a dream to Father Schirer while under hypnosis, featuring the devout nurses at the clinic and visions of the Garden of Eden where foliage bursts with naked female bottoms. The next night, Puppis sleepwalks to Father Schirer's room and molests him while he is fast asleep. Protecting his vow of chastity, the priest/analyst wakes up the randy senator. Once fully awake, Puppis realizes his actions and professes to feel much better, claiming his dreams have liberated his mind. Puppis returns to Rome full of optimism about his cure the following morning. However, back at the clinic, when Father Schirer takes confession from the nuns, he discovers that Puppis' rampaging sexual dreams have been enacted for real. The libidinous sisters all recount sexual encounters with Puppis.

An angry Father Schirer arrives at Puppis' house and demands an explanation. He is forced to hide when Cardinal Maravigili comes unexpectedly to meet Puppis. Hiding in the bathroom in a shower cubicle, Father Schirer suffers a fatal heart attack when he thinks Cardinal Maravigili will walk in. Unaware of Schirer's sudden demise, Puppis leaves with Cardinal Maravigili to a garden party before celebrating the Italian Republic's founding. After experiencing erotic visions, Puppis swiftly seduces the French ambassador's wife in the bushes. Back at Puppis' house, Carmelino discovers the dead body of Father Schirer and rushes to tell Puppis, only to be grabbed and taken away by Don Gesualdo, leading the Vatican secret police.

Returning home that evening, Puppis is met by Sister Hildergardt, the only one of the cloistered order not to have been ravished by him. Begging him to relieve her of temptation and simultaneously scolding him for wickedness, she implores that they whip each for their sins. Just as the twisted couple gets down to it, the Vatican thugs arrive. Puppis and Sister Hildergardt escape through a back window.

Hiding out in a secluded motel room, Puppis and Sister Hildegarde are tracked down, and Don Gesualdo and his thugs take her away. Cardinal Maravigli confronts Puppis in the motel room, and he tells the Cardinal that he wants out of politics. But the Cardinal replies that there will be none of that talk. Too much time and effort have been expended behind the scenes to hoist Puppis into position. The Cardinal takes Puppis into the bowels of the Vatican to view waxworks of recently canonized saints. They include Carmelino and Father Lucian, as well as Father Schirer. The threat to Puppis is made explicit when he is told to look carefully at an unfinished rough wax model. Staring at the shapeless features, Puppis imagines a waxwork of himself. When Senator Torsello dies the next day in a "plane crash," Puppis is declared the winner of the election by default.

At a ceremony to accept his appointment as president of Italy, Puppis genuflects before a wax statue of Sister Hildegarde. Puppis knows that his political position trapped him with the corrupt Vatican thugs whom he now can never escape. "The new president is remarkably religious," whispers an onlooker to another. As Puppis, the new chief of state, gives his inaugural address on live TV, a customer in a local bar switches off the televised ceremony who chooses instead to watch a foolish game show on the next channel.

Cast 
 Lando Buzzanca: Giacinto 'Gianni' Puppis 
 Lionel Stander: Cardinal Maravidi
 Laura Antonelli: Sister Hildegarde 
 Renzo Palmer: Father Lucion 
 Corrado Gaipa: Don Gesualdo
 Agostina Belli: Sister Brunhilde
 Feodor Chaliapin Jr.: Senator Torsello
 Francis Blanche: Father Schirer
 Eva Czemerys: Fantasy Woman 
 José Quaglio: Pietro Fornari
 Arturo Dominici: His Excellency 
 Anita Strindberg: French Ambassador's Wife
 Aldo Puglisi: Carmelino

References

External links

1972 films
Italian political comedy films
Italian parody films
Commedia sexy all'italiana
Films set in Rome
Films directed by Lucio Fulci
Films scored by Fred Bongusto
1970s sex comedy films
1972 comedy films
1970s political comedy films
1970s Italian-language films
1970s Italian films